Tooheys New is a standard Australian lager and the most popular of the Tooheys' beers owned by the New Zealand Lion Nathan beverages company. 

It can be found on tap at almost any bar in New South Wales and has historically been the state's number 1 beer.

History

It was first brewed in 1931 and was marketed under the name Tooheys New Special. In the 1970s, the beer began being marketed as Tooheys New Special Draught when sold in cans and bottles, later shortened to Tooheys Draught.  Tap beer was still sold as Tooheys New, however.  In 1998, the company decided to sell the beer under one name across all modes as Tooheys New.

Currently Tooheys New is official sponsor of the New South Wales Rugby Union's club competition (the Tooheys New Cup), is the official beer of the Wallabies and sponsors the Melbourne Cup. Through 2006, it was also naming sponsor of the Australian section of the Super 14 Rugby Competition, but was replaced by Investec Bank after their sponsorship contract expired.

In the mid-1970s the beer was successfully promoted with a jingle 'I feel like a Tooheys or two', one of the more successful campaigns in Australian advertising. The jingle's ubiquitous presence registered such that when school children were tested and asked to complete the following: 'I feel like...’ For the vast majority there was only one right answer: 'A Tooheys' The jingle also made an impression on touring rocker David Bowie who sang it during the encore of his final Australian concert in 1978.

Around 2008/09, Tooheys New began a marketing campaign, to have only 5 ingredients. Malt, hops, barley, yeast and sugar to break away from previous brew with many additives.

White Stag
In September 2008, Tooheys came out with a low-carbohydrate beer product called Tooheys New White Stag.  It is a full strength beer with the claim of "only one third of the carbs of standard full strength beers". The name has been re-used from Tooheys Stag lager released in 1930. Toohey's advertising blurb claims that New is equivalent to the old Stag lager.

See also

Australian pub
Beer in Australia
List of breweries in Australia

References

External links 
 Tooheys New product site
 Tooheys New tasting notes

Kirin Group
Australian beer brands
1930 establishments in Australia
Culture of New South Wales